Lazul River may refer to:

 Lazul, a tributary of the Latorița in Vâlcea County
 Lazul, a tributary of the Teregova in Caraș-Severin County

See also 
 Laz (river)
 Lazu River (disambiguation)